Dannin is a surname. Notable people with the surname include:

 Ellen Dannin (born 1951), American professor
 Leo Dannin (1898–1971), Danish footballer

See also
 Danin (name)
 Dantin